The Newark Little Giants were a professional baseball team based in Newark, New Jersey in the late 1880s. They played in the Eastern League for one year until moving to the International League in 1887.

Newark featured the first all African-American battery with George Stovey, pitching a 2.46 ERA, and catcher Moses Fleetwood Walker (also first African-American to play in the majors), who had a .264 batting average.

The Little Giants went out of business in 1888. They returned to the minors in 1889 and won second place in the Atlantic Association. After taking third in 1890, Newark again went out of business, this time forever.

Defunct baseball teams in New Jersey
Baseball teams established in 1886
Baseball teams disestablished in 1891
1886 establishments in New Jersey
1891 disestablishments in New Jersey
Sports in Newark, New Jersey
Atlantic Association teams
Defunct International League teams